In the Book of Mormon, Amalickiah (Ameleckiah as a frequent scribal variant in the original manuscript) was a Nephite leader of a movement to reestablish a king, specifically himself, as the king of the Nephites.  When he failed to gain power through a popular uprising he dissented to the Lamanites becoming their king and using them as a means to gain power over the Nephites.  He was killed during the ensuing war.

Biography

Amalickiahite movement
The Amalickiahite movement arose during a power vacuum following the separation of church and state and by the transfer of leadership of the church from Alma the Younger to his son Helaman.  Helaman succeeded his father as High Priest over the Nephite Church but did not have any political authority.  His father was the last High Priest who also held the post of Chief Judge (or governor) of the Nephites.  Alma the Younger had found that the church suffered from neglect due to his political duties and so resigned the latter office.

Amalickiah is described as a large and strong man who was also an eloquent speaker.  He may have been a lower (i.e. local) judge, for many of his followers (called Amalickiahites) held that office.  It is noted that he was also a member of the Nephite Church, and that the lower judges were members themselves.  They were upset with the reforms or "regulation" of the church established by Helaman following the last war with the Lamanites.  They were angry over the preaching by Helaman and his high priests — so angry that they were willing to kill Helaman and all those that held an opposing view.

Moroni's counter-revolution
Captain Moroni learned of the Amalickiahites' rebellion, and rallied the Nephite people against it.  He raised the Title of Liberty over the capital, and then over every city of the land where the rebellion was taking place.  Those that followed the Title of Liberty and the reformed church called themselves Christians.  The rebels were soon outnumbered in the land, their hopes for power broken.

Dissent to the Lamanites
Amalickiah led his followers away into the wilderness to join the Lamanites when he realized his political campaign had failed.  Moroni did not want their enemy to gain any further strength so he set off in pursuit with the army.  Moroni's army defeated the rebels, but Amalickiah and a small band of trusted followers escaped to the land of Nephi.

King of the Lamanites
Amalickiah and his men went to the court of the Lamanite king and persuaded him to issue a call to arms against the Nephites.  However, this proved unpopular with the majority of warriors, the Lamanites having just lost a costly war against the Nephites.  Amalickiah flattered the king and got appointed to command the loyalists.  He is ordered to go and compel the rest of the warriors into the army to fight for the king.

The rebels outnumbered the loyalist army that Amalickiah commands.  Knowing he would likely fail to press the warriors into the army, he came up with plan to use his greatest strengths: flattery and treachery.  Setting up camp at the base of a large hill where the rebels were in their defensive position, he secretly sent word to the rebel leader Lehonti that he will betray the loyalists into the rebels' hands if he is made second in command of the rebel army.  Lehonti agrees, and Amalickiah sets his own men as guards, allowing the rebel army to approach and surround the loyalist camp.  When the loyal warriors woke to see themselves in a hopeless position, they begged Amalickiah to allow them to surrender and join the rebels to save their lives.  Amalickiah gains standing with the rebels, "saves" his men, and becomes second-in-command of the combined Lamanite army.

This was not enough for Amalickiah, for he wanted to be king.  He slowly poisoned Lehonti while the army is marching to the capital.  When Lehonti died on the march, command then fell to Amalickiah.  At the capital the Lamanite king got word that his army is approaching with general Amalickiah at the head.  The king was pleased and, accompanied by his closest servants, went to meet him.  As the king neared, the henchmen of Amalickiah went before him bowing to the king.  The king raised his arm beckoning them to rise.  As the first henchman does he drew a dagger and thrust it up into the chest of the king.  He fell, slain by the assassins.

The servants of the king then turned to run away.  Amalickiah's henchmen shouted to the army that the king has been slain by his own servants.  Amalickiah led the warriors to the fallen king and feigns heartache at such treachery.  He goaded the warriors, former loyalist and rebel alike, to go and slay the king's servants.  Despite pursuit, the servants escape to the Nephites and tell the tale of Amalickiah's deceit.

Meanwhile, as commander of the army, Amalickiah goes to the court to tell the queen the awful news.  After telling of the treacherous attack by the king's servants, he brings forth his assassins who swear that the servants fled because of their perfidity.  Amalickiah comforts and woos the grieving queen.  Soon he marries her to become the next king of the Lamanites.

War against the Nephites
As the new king Amalickiah proceeded to aggravate the Lamanites to war against the Nephites.  Staying behind with his new queen, he sent his armies to attack the Nephites under the command of Nephite dissenters.  Their plan was to attack those cities that had previously shown to be weakest.  Unfortunately for them, Captain Moroni had fortified all the Nephite cities, in case of such a sneak attack.  The Lamanites proceeded to assault the walls of these "weak" cities, never once managing to slay a single Nephite in the process, while losing many men and all their chief captains who led the forlorn hope.  They returned to relate the tale of bad news to their king.

King Amalickiah, however, was not to be deterred.  As the Nephites were dealing with king-men, Amalickiah saw his advantage, and began to capture Nephite cities on the eastern coast, well away from Captain Moroni and his main army.  After taking seven cities, however, he was met by Teancum whose force stood up to the king.  Teancum's warriors wore the Lamanite army down till they withdrew into camp for the night.  Teancum sneaked into the king's camp with a trusted aide and killed Amalickiah with a javelin.

Etymology
The "-iah" suffix can be found in a number of Book of Mormon names such as Mosiah and Sariah, as well as the Biblical names Isaiah, Jeremiah and Zedekiah, where it represents Yah or Jah (Yah), a shortening of the name Yahweh (Jehovah). This short form of the name occurs 50 times in the text of the Hebrew Bible, of which 24 form part of the phrase "Hallelujah", which is actually a two-word phrase, not one word.

The preceding syllables resemble the name Amaleki, which according to Hugh Nibley, simply means "my king." Thus Amalickiah may mean "My King is Jah".

References 

Book of Mormon people